Hirfynydd is a 481-metre-high hill in Neath Port Talbot county borough in South Wales. A Roman road, Sarn Helen, runs along its entire northeast–southwest ridge-line, a route followed by a modern-day byway. To its west is Cwm Dulais and to its southeast is the Vale of Neath. The northern end of the ridge falls away to a broad upland vale containing the Afon Pyrddin and beyond which is the Brecon Beacons National Park.

The larger part of the hill is afforested with conifers. In between the plantations are areas of past or present opencasting for coal.

Geology 
The upper parts of the hill are formed from the hard-wearing sandstones and intervening mudstones of the Pennant Sandstone. Beneath these are the mudstones and coal seams of the South Wales Coal Measures. All the strata are tilted in a generally southerly direction towards the axis of the South Wales Coalfield syncline though there is significant local variation, due in part to the proximity of the eastern slopes of the hill to the Neath Disturbance.

Burial cairn 
The Bronze Age Carn Cornel Round Cairn is on the shoulder of hillside, west of the  ridge and Roman road. (Location: , OS grid ref: SN816062.) It is a pile of stones marking a burial, and occupies what appears to be a natural mound. Close by is a boundary stone, suggesting that the site became a historic boundary mark.

Roman Fortlet
This is a Roman fortlet, or Castellum, used to both control the Carmarthen to Brecon Sarn Helen Roman road, and provide a signal station with wide visibility to the surrounding area. The enclosure is a Scheduled Ancient Monument.

Medieval settlement
There are a group of medieval house platforms on the edge of a plateau of the Hirfynydd ridge, beside the steep slopes of the Dulais valley, showing where a settlement had been. (Location: , OS grid ref: SN806063). A banked rectangular enclosure has a house platform in the west corner. Two further platforms are west of the enclosure. The site is a Scheduled monument and is also called Coed Ddu and Nant-y-Cafn enclosure.

Access 
Parts of the hill are available as open access for walkers under the Countryside and Rights of Way Act 2000. In addition there are numerous forest tracks which provide access and public rights of way in some areas. Saint Illtyd's Walk, a recreational walking trail follows a public bridleway to pass over Hirfynydd between Crynant and Resolven.

See  also
List of Scheduled Monuments in Neath Port Talbot

References

External links 
 images of Hirfynydd and area on Geograph website
 Hirfynydd Roman Fortlet - Roman Britain

Mountains and hills of Neath Port Talbot
Marilyns of Wales